Donald Vigesaa (born February 26, 1953) is an American politician. He is a member of the North Dakota House of Representatives from the 23rd District, serving since 2003. He is a member of the Republican party.

Vigesaa is a car dealer from Cooperstown.

References

Republican Party members of the North Dakota House of Representatives
1953 births
Living people
Place of birth missing (living people)
21st-century American politicians